Tankougounadié is a department or commune of Yagha Province in Burkina Faso.

References 

Departments of Burkina Faso
Yagha Province